Blooming Grove Township may refer to the following townships in the United States:

 Blooming Grove Township, Franklin County, Indiana
 Blooming Grove Township, Waseca County, Minnesota
 Blooming Grove Township, Richland County, Ohio
 Blooming Grove Township, Pike County, Pennsylvania